Vietnam competed at the 2012 Summer Olympics in London, from July 27 to August 12, 2012. This was the nation's eighth appearance at the Olympics, having missed the 1984 Summer Olympics in Los Angeles, because of the Soviet boycott.

The Vietnam Olympic Committee (VOC) sent the nation's largest delegation to the Games since 1980. A total of 18 athletes, 6 men and 12 women, competed in 11 sports. For the first time in its Olympic history, Vietnam was represented by more female than male athletes. This was also the youngest delegation in Vietnam's Olympic history, with half under the age of 24, and many of them were expected to reach their peak in time for the 2016 Summer Olympics in Rio de Janeiro. Sixteen athletes competed in their first Olympics, including épée fencer Nguyễn Tiến Nhật, who was the nation's flag bearer at the opening ceremony.

Despite fielding its largest delegation to these games, Vietnam, however, failed to win a single medal. Pistol shooter Hoàng Xuân Vinh and weightlifter Trần Lê Quốc Toàn narrowly missed out on Olympic medals in London, after finishing fourth in their respective sporting events.

In 2020, after the disqualification one athlete in a weightlifting men's 56 kg event, the bronze medal in this event was redistributed to Trần Lê Quốc Toàn.

Medalists

Competitors

Athletics 

Vietnamese athletes who have so far achieved qualifying standards.

Key
 Note – Ranks given for track events are within the athlete's heat only
 Q = Qualified for the next round
 q = Qualified for the next round as a fastest loser or, in field events, by position without achieving the qualifying target
 NR = National record
 N/A = Round not applicable for the event
 Bye = Athlete not required to compete in round

Women
Track & road events

Field events

Badminton

Vietnam has just qualified one athlete

Fencing

Vietnam has qualified one fencer.
Men

Gymnastics

Vietnam has qualified three athletes

Men

Women

Judo

Rowing

Vietnam has qualified one boat.
Women

Qualification Legend: FA=Final A (medal); FB=Final B (non-medal); FC=Final C (non-medal); FD=Final D (non-medal); FE=Final E (non-medal); FF=Final F (non-medal); SA/B=Semifinals A/B; SC/D=Semifinals C/D; SE/F=Semifinals E/F; QF=Quarterfinals; R=Repechage

Shooting
 
Vietnam has qualified two athletes 

Men

Women

Swimming

Women

Taekwondo

Vietnam has qualified two athletes.

Weightlifting

Vietnam has qualified two athletes

Wrestling

Vietnam has qualified one athlete.

Key:
  – Victory by Fall.
  – Decision by Points – the loser with technical points.
  – Decision by Points – the loser without technical points.

Women's freestyle

See also
Vietnam at the 2012 Summer Paralympics

References

External links
 Vietnam at the 2012 Summer Olympics on Vietnam Olympic Committee's website 
 Vietnam at the 2012 Summer Olympics  

Summer Olympics
Nations at the 2012 Summer Olympics
2012